John D. "Colonel Jack" Henderson was an American editor, rancher, businessman, and pro-slavery politician in the Kansas Territory. He was a Colonel in the Border Wars of Bleeding Kansas.

He was born in Pennsylvania but moved to the Kansas Territory and became a leading advocate of slavery there. He was the proprietor and editor of the Leavenworth Journal. He was elected Chairman of the Central Committee of the pro-slavery National Democratic Party of Kansas but was later accused of vote fraud.

In 1859, Henderson built a ranch, trading post, and hotel on Henderson Island in the South Platte River in Arapaho County, Kansas Territory. Henderson sold meat and provisions to gold seekers on their way up the South Platte River Trail to the gold fields during the Pike's Peak Gold Rush. Henderson Island was the first permanent settlement in the South Platte River Valley between Fort Saint Vrain in the Nebraska Territory and the Cherry Creek Diggings in the Kansas Territory. He returned to eastern Kansas and fought for the Union in the American Civil War.

In Colorado, Henderson bought a chain of gold mines; on a visit to Colorado he and some eighteen others were slaughtered by a group of Osage Indians for crossing the Osage territory with loaded weapons.

The Adams County Fairgrounds are now located on Henderson Island.  The community of Henderson, Colorado, has been largely absorbed by Commerce City, Colorado.

References

External links
 References to John D. Henderson at books.google.com

Adams County, Colorado
History of Colorado
Kansas Democrats
Place of birth missing
American newspaper publishers (people)
American newspaper editors
People of Colorado in the American Civil War
Year of death missing
Year of birth missing